Alex Hutton-Mills is a Ghanaian politician and was a member of the first parliament of the second Republic of Ghana. He  represented the Ga constituency under the membership of the United Nationalist Party (UNP).

Early life and education 
Alex was born on 26 December 1935. He attended Dulwich College, Keble College, Oxford and the Middle Temple where he obtained a Bachelor of Laws in Law. He later worked as a lawyer before going into Parliament.

He was the managing director of the Tema food complex corporation.

Personal life 
He is a Male in gender and Christian in faith.

Politics 
He began his political career in 1969 when he became the parliamentary candidate for the United Nationalist Party (UNP) to represent his constituency in the Greater Accra of Ghana prior to the commencement of the 1969 Ghanaian parliamentary election.

He was sworn into the First Parliament of the Second Republic of Ghana on 1 October 1969, after being pronounced the winner of the 1969 Ghanaian election held on 26 August 1969. 
His tenure ended on 13 January 1972.

References 

1935 births
Living people
Ghanaian MPs 1969–1972
20th-century Ghanaian lawyers
United National Party politicians